De Britto College High School Yogyakarta ("JB" after John de Britto, a 17th-century Portuguese missionary to India) is a private Catholic all-boys high school run by the Indonesian Province of the Society of Jesus (Jesuits) in Yogyakarta, Indonesia. It was founded by the Jesuits on August 19, 1948, on an  campus.

Notable alumni

See also
 Catholic Church in Indonesia
 Catholic school
 List of Jesuit sites

References

Catholic schools in Indonesia
Senior high schools in Indonesia